William J. Simpson (12 December 1929 – 27 January 2017) was a Northern Ireland international footballer, who played for Linfield, Rangers, Stirling Albion, Partick Thistle and Oxford United.

Career
Simpson signed for Rangers from Linfield for a sum of £11,500 in 1950. He spent nine years (1950–59) at Rangers making 239 appearances and scoring 163 goals. He won three championship medals and a Scottish Cup winners medal with Rangers to add to the two Irish League and two Irish Cups he won with Linfield. He left Ibrox in 1959 and spent the last couple of years of his career with Stirling Albion, Partick Thistle and (then non-league) Oxford United.

As an illustration of his popularity, in the fictional song "A Trip to Ibrox" Billy Simpson is credited with scoring twice in a "Ne'erday" Old Firm Derby at Ibrox. Whereby Rangers were 1-0 down at half time, and Simpson inspired his team to a second half comeback after Willie Waddell had scored an equaliser. 

In recognition of his service to that club, Simpson has been made a member of the Rangers F.C. Hall of Fame.

Simpson made his debut for Northern Ireland in 1951 against Wales, scoring in the process. He represented his country twelve times in total between 1951 and 1958, scoring 5 goals. He was selected in Northern Ireland's squad for the 1958 FIFA World Cup in Sweden but a late injury ensured he did not play at all during the finals.

In April 2015, the feature-length documentary Spirit of '58 was screened as part of the Belfast Film Festival. It featured Billy Simpson prominently alongside the other surviving players (Billy Bingham, Peter McParland, Jimmy McIlroy and Harry Gregg) as it told the story of Northern Ireland's journey throughout the 1950s under the managership of Peter Doherty, culminating in the 1958 World Cup.

References

External links
 

1929 births
2017 deaths
Association footballers from Belfast
Association footballers from Northern Ireland
Northern Ireland international footballers
1958 FIFA World Cup players
Linfield F.C. players
Rangers F.C. players
Stirling Albion F.C. players
Partick Thistle F.C. players
Oxford United F.C. players
Scottish Football League players
Association football forwards